Kenge Airport  is an airport serving the town of Kenge in Democratic Republic of the Congo.

See also

 Transport in the Democratic Republic of the Congo
 List of airports in the Democratic Republic of the Congo

References

External links
 OpenStreetMap - Kenge
 OurAirports - Kenge
 SkyVector - Kenge Airport
 
 HERE Maps - Kenge

Airports in Kwango